The 1935 Pacific hurricane season ran through the summer and fall of 1935. Before the satellite age started in the 1960s, data on east Pacific hurricanes was extremely unreliable. Most east Pacific storms were of no threat to land. This season saw three tropical cyclones and ended early in August.

Systems

Tropical Storm One
A tropical storm caused gales in Manzanillo on July 1.

Tropical Cyclone Two
On August 5, a tropical cyclone formed just off the coast of Mexico. It generally moved west-northwest, and was last seen August 9.

Tropical Cyclone Three
South of the Gulf of Tehuantepec, a tropical cyclone formed on August 17. It remained poorly organized and moved slowly, making landfall on August 20. It had moved back off shore by August 21. It headed northwest, passing west of Cabo San Lucas, and hugged the Pacific coast of the Baja California Peninsula. It rapidly weakened as it headed north, and its remnants made landfall near Point Conception, California, on August 26 and dissipated after that.

The tropical cyclone destroyed many buildings in Salina Cruz on August 20. It also blew down trees and downed power lines. No casualties were reported.

See also

1935 Atlantic hurricane season
1935 Pacific typhoon season
1930s North Indian Ocean cyclone seasons
 1900–1940 South Pacific cyclone seasons
 1900–1950 South-West Indian Ocean cyclone seasons
 1930s Australian region cyclone seasons

References

1935 in California
Pacific hurricane seasons
1930s Pacific hurricane seasons